is a passenger railway station in the city of Ichikawa, Chiba, Japan, operated by East Japan Railway Company (JR East).

Lines and services
Located on the south side of the triangle formed by the Keiyō Line and Musashino Line, this station is not served by Musashino Line through services.

Station layout
The elevated station consists of a single island platform serving two tracks. The station has a Midori no Madoguchi staffed ticket office.

Platforms

History
The station opened on 1 December 1988.

Station numbering was introduced in 2016 with Futamatashimmachi being assigned station number JE10.

Passenger statistics
In fiscal 2019, the station was used by an average of 4,983 passengers daily (boarding passengers only).

The passenger figures for previous years are as shown below.

Surrounding area
 Tokyo Management College
 
 Ichikawaminami High School
 Kohya Junior High School

See also
 List of railway stations in Japan

References

External links

 Futamatashimmachi Station 
 Keiyo Line Navi – Futamatashimmachi Station  

Railway stations in Japan opened in 1988
Railway stations in Chiba Prefecture
Keiyō Line
Ichikawa, Chiba